Leonard Frank Garwood (28 July 1923 – 1979) was an English professional footballer who played for Hitchin Town, Tottenham Hotspur and Bedford Town.

Playing career
Garwood played non-league football for Eton Bray, Cambridge Town and Hitchin Town before signing amateur forms for Tottenham Hotspur in 1944. The wing half made his debut in a war time league match against Coventry City in 1946 and signed part-time professional forms soon after. He made his senior debut on 23 October 1948 and featured in two matches  and made over 200 appearances in reserve and A fixtures. In August 1952 he joined Bedford Town where he played for a further seven years. In the summer of 1954, he played in the National Soccer League with Toronto Ulster United.

Biography
Garwood was born in India where his father was serving with the Armed forces. He later trained as toolmaker and was employed by Waterlow and Sons of Dunstable. Outside of football Garwood was a keen cricketer and turned out for Eton Bray. Garwood died on 16 July 1979 at Dunstable.

References

1923 births
1979 deaths
English footballers
English Football League players
Hitchin Town F.C. players
Tottenham Hotspur F.C. players
Bedford Town F.C. players
Toronto Ulster United players
Association football midfielders
People from Dunstable
People from Almora district
Canadian National Soccer League players
British people in colonial India
British expatriates in Canada